Greifswalder Oie (literally "Greifswald's isle") is a small island in the Baltic Sea, located east of Rügen on the German coast. The island covers an area of about 54 hectares. The isle forms part of the municipality of Kröslin.

Geography 
The Greifswalder Oie is about 1,550 metres long, a maximum of 570 metres wide and, at the cliffs on its eastern side, a maximum of 19 metres high. It is about 12 kilometres off the shore of Usedom and belongs administratively to the municipality of Kröslin on the mainland. On the island, with its striking steep coast, is a 49 metre high  lighthouse with one of the strongest beacons in the Baltic. The whole island is a nature reserve.

It was formed during the last ice age, the Weichselian glaciation, by several glacial depositions from Scandinavia. On the Oie a total of three different deposition phases are evident, so that rocks originating in different parts of  Scandinavia may be found on the island.

History

Around 1929, Johannes Winkler experimented with small LOX methane rockets on the island. The island was a restricted military space from 1936 to 1991, first under control of Nazi Germany, and then the German Democratic Republic (East Germany). Between 1937 and 1945, numerous rockets were launched from Greifswalder Oie. In an operation designated Lighthouse, Wernher von Braun oversaw attempts to launch A3 rockets in December 1937, each of which failed. Between 1938 and 1942, the island was the scene for the nearly successful launches of the A5 rockets. Also twenty-eight A4/V2 rockets were launched vertically from Greifswalder Oie between 1943 and 1945. These launches were made in order to observe the reentrance of the rockets into the atmosphere.

Current condition

As of the 2000s, the islet is an uninhabited sea bird reserve, save for a single man who works the light house, manages the small emergency yacht harbour (depth ca. 1.6m / 6 ft), and creates outdoor art objects that he scatters along a path that circles the island. There is an infrequent ferry service from Peenemünde and Karlshagen.

References

German islands in the Baltic
Pomerania
Nature reserves in Mecklenburg-Western Pomerania
Islands of Mecklenburg-Western Pomerania
Spaceports in Europe